The deputy premier of South Australia is the second-most senior officer in the Government of South Australia. The deputy premiership is a ministerial portfolio in the Cabinet of South Australia, and the deputy premier is appointed by the governor on the advice of the premier of South Australia.

The current deputy premier since 2022 is Susan Close of the South Australian Division of the Australian Labor Party.

History
The office of Deputy Premier was created in March 1968. The first to serve in the position was Labor deputy leader Des Corcoran. Prior to that time the term was sometimes used unofficially for the second-highest ranking minister in the government, usually the Treasurer.

In both Labor and Liberal governments, the deputy premier is usually the party's deputy leader.

Two deputy premiers have subsequently become Premier in their own right: Des Corcoran and Rob Kerin. This last happened in 2001, when Rob Kerin became premier after John Olsen's resignation. Dean Brown did the reverse, becoming Deputy Premier to Rob Kerin, 5 years after his own premiership ended at the hands of John Olsen.

South Australia's longest-serving deputy premier is Kevin Foley, who served in the position from March 2002 to February 2011.

Duties
The duties of the deputy premier are to act on behalf of the premier in his or her absence overseas or on leave. The deputy premier has additionally always held at least one substantive portfolio. It is possible for a minister to hold only the portfolio of Deputy Premier, but this has never happened.

If the premier were to die, become incapacitated or resign, the Governor would normally appoint the deputy premier as Premier.  If the governing or majority party had not yet elected a new leader, that appointment would be on an interim basis.  Should a different leader emerge, that person would then be appointed Premier.

List of deputy premiers of South Australia

References

 Statistical Record of the Legislature 1836 – 2007

 
South Australia
Lists of people from South Australia
Ministers of the South Australian state government